Culver Lake is a natural lake in the U.S. states of Minnesota and South Dakota.

Culver Lake has the name of William Culver.

References

Lakes of Minnesota
Lakes of South Dakota
Lakes of Deuel County, South Dakota
Lakes of Yellow Medicine County, Minnesota